Bellman's Head is a headland point comprising the northern boundary of Stonehaven Bay in Stonehaven, Scotland.  The corresponding headland at the south of the bay is Downie Point.

See also
Fowlsheugh

References

Landforms of Aberdeenshire
Stonehaven
Headlands of Scotland